Rodolfo Giménez, better known by his artistic name Argentino Luna (21 June 1941 – 19 March 2011) was a singer-songwriter of Argentinian folk music.

Biography
Giménez was born in General Madariaga Partido, Buenos Aires, Argentina, the son of Esperanza Castañares and Juan Lino Giménez, who were labourers on a farm. He had five brothers. When he was an adolescent his parents moved the family to Villa Gesell on the Atlantic coast. He worked with his family in a sand processing plant. Even at this early age he enjoyed singing in his spare time.

Giménez married Ana Maria Kaúl when he was quite young and together they had four daughters. He moved to Quilmes in the city of Buenos Aires and started to frequent places where he played the guitar and participated in musical events. When he made his first recording, he was unable to use his own name as that had already been used and so he chose to use "Argentino Luna".

Musical career
Giménez toured throughout Argentina as well as Japan, Spain, the United States of America, Panama, Costa Rica, Uruguay and Brazil. He recorded more than 300 songs both as a solo artist and with others. He also wrote a number of songs for groups such as "The Chalets", "Los Quila Huasi" and "Los Cuatro de Cordoba" as well as individuals like Ramona Galarza, Alberto Marino, Jorge Cafrune, and Alfredo de Angelis.

Death
On 6 February 2011, while in the city of Caleta Olivia, Santa Cruz Province, Argentina, Giménez suffered renal failure and was treated in the local hospital. On 8 February he was transferred by helicopter to the nephrology department of the Favaloro Foundation University Hospital. On 23 February he underwent surgery but failed to recover and died on 19 March 2011.

Awards
Giménez was awarded during his lifetime:

 La Palma de Plata (The Silver Palm)
 El Limón de Oro (the Golden Lemon)
the Golden Gardel
 La Charrua de Oro (1995),
(and others)

Popular works  

Argentino y bien parido (1995)
A los argentinos
Ando por la huella
Aprendí en los rancheríos
Capitán de la espiga
Cuando callas por amor
Descorazonado
El malevo
Me olvidé de tu nombre
Gallitos del aire
Mire que lindo es mi país, paisano
Nos han robado país
Pal' Tuyú
Pero ellos, estaban antes
Uno nunca entiende
Zamba para decir adiós.
Pimpollo
Me preguntan como ando
Los hijos de mis hijas
Que bien le ha ido
Voy a seguir por vos
Ay... Patria mía
Villa Gesell del recuerdo
En el Patio de mi Casa

References

External links
 Argentino Luna singing "Cuanta Tristeza, Pais"
 Argentino Luna singing "Argentino y Bien Parido"

1941 births
2011 deaths
Folk musicians
Argentine male singer-songwriters
Argentine singer-songwriters
Musicians from Buenos Aires
Writers from Buenos Aires